Mehkuyeh may refer to:
 Mehkuyeh-ye Olya
 Mehkuyeh-ye Sofla